Citrus papuana may refer to:

 Citrus papuana  a synonym of Citrus hystrix, the Kaffir lime
 Microcitrus papuana , a synonym of Citrus wintersii, the Brown River finger lime